Hassan Tall (born 18 January 1964) is a Liberian sprinter. He competed in the men's 4 × 100 metres relay at the 1984 Summer Olympics.

References

1964 births
Living people
Athletes (track and field) at the 1984 Summer Olympics
Liberian male sprinters
Olympic athletes of Liberia
Place of birth missing (living people)